Commemorative coins have been issued by the Royal Danish Mint in Denmark since 1848.

Coins issued from the Royal Danish Mint from 1848 to 1972

Specie Daler
28.8930 grams .875 silver  ASW . in diameter

1848 - Death of King Christian VIII, accession of King Frederik VII

2 Rigsdaler
28.8930 grams .875 silver  ASW . in diameter

1863 - Death of King Frederik VII, accession of King Christian IX

2 Kroner
15.0000 grams .800 silver  ASW . in diameter
  
 1888 - 25th anniversary of reign, King Christian IX
 1892 - 50th wedding anniversary of King Christian IX & Queen Louise
 1903 - 40th anniversary of reign, King Christian IX
 1906 - Death of King Christian IX, accession of King Frederik VIII
 1912 - Death of Frederik VIII, accession of King Christian X
 1923 - 25th wedding anniversary of King Christian X & Queen Alexandrine
 1930 - 60th birthday of King Christian X
 1937 - 25th anniversary of accession of King Christian X
 1945 - 75th birthday of King Christian X
 1953 - Greenland
 1958 - 18th birthday of Crown Princess Margrethe
The above were also struck in medallic form and can be distinguished from their coin issues as they do not contain a kroner denomination.

5 Kroner
17.0000 grams .800 silver  ASW . in diameter

 1960 - 25th wedding anniversary of King Frederik IX & Queen Ingrid
 1964 - Wedding of Princess Anne Marie 18 September 1964
The above were also struck in medallic form and can be distinguished from their coin issues as they do not contain a kroner denomination.

10 Kroner

20.0000 grams .800 silver  ASW . in diameter

 1967 - Wedding of Crown Princess Margrethe & Henri de Laborde de Monpezat
 1968 - Wedding of Princess Benedicte
 1972 - Death of King Frederik IX, accession of Queen Margrethe II 14 January
The above were also struck in medallic form and can be distinguished from their coin issues as they do not contain a kroner denomination.

Coins issued from the Royal Danish Mint from 1986 to the present

Ships series

500 Kroner
31.1035 grams .999 silver 31.10 grams ASW 38 mm in diameter.
 2008 - "The Dannebrog" Royal Yacht
The above coin also included a 20 Kroner coin of the same design struck in aluminum-bronze released for circulation and issued as a proof strike in limited quantity.

Royal Occasions

200 Kroner
31.1035 grams .800 silver 24.88 grams ASW 38 mm. in diameter
 1990 - 50th Birthday of Queen Margrethe II
The above coin also included a 20 Kroner coin of the same design struck in aluminum-bronze released for circulation.

200 Kroner

31.1035 grams .999 silver 31.10 grams ASW 38 mm. in diameter
 1992 - 25th wedding anniversary of the Queen & Prince consort
 1995 – 1000 years of Danish coinage
 1995 - Wedding of Prince Joachim 18 November
 1997 - 25th anniversary of accession of the Queen
 2000 - 60th Birthday of Queen Margrethe II
 2004 - Wedding of Crown Prince Frederik 14 May
The above coins also included a 20 Kroner coin of the same design struck in aluminum-bronze released for circulation.

500 Kroner
31.1035 grams .999 silver 31.10 grams ASW 38 mm. in diameter
2010 - 70th Birthday of HM Queen Margrethe II
2012 - 40th anniversary of accession, Queen Margrethe II - reverse shield includes Faeroe Island & Greenland crests
2015 - 75th Birthday of HM Queen Margrethe II - front-facing portrait - reverse includes commemorative dates (to be issued in April 2015)

The above coin will also be issued as a 20 kroner aluminium-bronze coin in proof quality and for circulation.

1000 Kroner
8.65 grams .900 gold. 22 mm. in diameter
2010 - 70th Birthday of HM Queen Margrethe II

3000 Kroner
8.65 grams .900 gold. 22 mm. in diameter
2012 - 40th anniversary of accession, Queen Margrethe II - reverse shield includes Faeroe Island & Greenland crests

10 Kroner
14.3000 grams .800 silver 11.40 grams ASW 32 mm. in diameter
 1986 - 18th birthday of crown Prince Frederik 26 May

The above coin also included a 10 Kroner coin of the same design struck in cupro-nickel released for circulation and issued as a proof strike in limited quantity.

International Polar year

3 coins in the series.

1000 Kroner - gold
8.65 grams .900 gold 7.78 grams AGW 22 mm. in diameter

Gold sourced from Greenland for this series includes polar bear mintmark
 2007 - Polar bear, endangered species (winner of the 2008 COTY award for best gold coin)
 2008 - Sirius dog sled Patrol
 2009 - Northern Lights - Scientific research

100 Kroner - silver
31.1035 grams .999 silver 31.10 grams ASW 38 mm. in diameter
 2007 - Polar bear, endangered species
 2008 - Sirius dog sled Patrol
 2009 - Northern Lights - Scientific research
The above coins also included a 10 Kroner coin of the same design struck in aluminum-bronze released for circulation.

200th anniversary, birth of Hans Christian Andersen
5 coins in the series.

10 Kroner - gold
8.65 grams .900 gold 7.785 grams AGW 22 mm. in diameter
 2005 - The Ugly Duckling"
 2005 - "The Little Mermaid"
 2006 - "The Shadow"
 2006 - "The Snow Queen" (winner of the 2007 COTY award for most artistic coin design)
 2007 - "The Nightingale"

10 Kroner - silver
31.1035 grams .999 silver 31.10 grams ASW 38 mm. in diameter
 2005 - Ugly Duckling
 2005 - "The Little Mermaid"
 2006 - "The Shadow"
 2006 - "The Snow Queen" (winner of the 2007 COTY award for most artistic coin design)
 2007 - "The Nightingale"

The above coins also included a 10 Kroner coin of the same design struck in aluminum-bronze released for circulation

Towers series

20 Kroner
Aluminum-bronze base metal. 10 coins in the set.

 2002 - Aarhus City Hall
 2003 - Børsen; Old Copenhagen Stock Exchange
 2003 - Christiansborg Palace
 2004 - "The Goose Tower, Vordingborg Castle"
 2004 - Svaneke Water Tower
 2005 - Landet Church Tower
 2005 - Nólsoy Lighthouse, Faeroe Islands
 2006 - Gråsten Palace
 2006 - "Three Brothers"
 2007 - Copenhagen City Hall

Ships series (2007–2012)
12 coins in the series.

Scientist series 2013

500 Kroner

.999 silver

31.1 grams

38 mm. diameter

4 coins in the series.

Niels Bohr : Atomic model

Hans Christian Ørsted : Electromagnetism

Ole Rømer : The speed of light

Tycho Brahe : Stella Nova

The above coins were also issued in 20 Kroner denominations in an aluminium-bronze alloy minted in both Proof quality and in circulation quality.

References

2008 source MAA - LBMRC

Denmark
Coins of Denmark